Daniel Hodge (born ) is a Curaçaoan politician who served as the third Prime Minister of Curaçao.

References

1959 births
Living people
Party for the Restructured Antilles politicians
Prime Ministers of Curaçao